Leni Breymaier (born 26 April 1960) is a German politician of the Social Democratic Party of Germany (SPD).

Life and political career 
Breymaier was born in 1960 in Ulm and became an SPD member in 1982.

From 2016 until 2018, Breymaier served as chairwoman of the SPD in the federal state of Baden-Württemberg, succeeding Nils Schmid.

Member of the German Parliament, 2017–present 
Breymaier has been a member of the German Bundestag since the 2017 elections, elected on the SPD party list for Baden-Württemberg. In the negotiations to form a coalition government under the leadership of Chancellor Angela Merkel following the elections, she was part of the working group on municipalities and rural areas, led by Reiner Haseloff, Kurt Gribl and Michael Groschek.

Breymaier has since been serving on the Committee on Family Affairs, Senior Citizens, Women and Youth, where she is her parliamentary group's rapporteur on demographic transition, pensions, and forced prostitution. Since the 2021 elections, she has been serving as her parliamentary group’s spokesperson for family affairs, senior citizens, women and youth. Since 2022, she has also been serving on the parliamentary body in charge of appointing judges to the Highest Courts of Justice, namely the Federal Court of Justice (BGH), the Federal Administrative Court (BVerwG), the Federal Fiscal Court (BFH), the Federal Labour Court (BAG), and the Federal Social Court (BSG). That same year, she joined the Commission for the Reform of the Electoral Law and the Modernization of Parliamentary Work, co-chaired by Johannes Fechner and Nina Warken. 

In addition to her committee assignments, Breymaier is a member of the German-Israeli Parliamentary Friendship Group. Within the SPD parliamentary group, she belongs to the Parliamentary Left, a left-wing movement.

In the negotiations to form a coalition government between the SPD, the Green Party and Free Democratic Party (FDP) following the 2021 federal elections, Breymaier was part of her party's delegation in the working group on equality, co-chaired by Petra Köpping, Ricarda Lang and Herbert Mertin.

Other activities

Corporate boards
 Bausparkasse Schwäbisch Hall, Member of the Supervisory Board (-2018)
 Barmer, Member of the Supervisory Board (1999-2005, 2008-2010)

Non-profit organizations
 Willy Brandt Center Jerusalem, Member (since 2018)
 Union of Persecutees of the Nazi Regime (VNN), Member (since 2010)
 German United Services Trade Union (ver.di), Member (since 1976)

Personal life
Since 1986, Breymaier has been living in Eislingen.

References 

1960 births
Living people
Members of the Bundestag 2021–2025
Members of the Bundestag 2017–2021
Members of the Bundestag for Baden-Württemberg
Members of the Bundestag for the Social Democratic Party of Germany